Stogumber is a village and civil parish in Somerset, England, on the eastern flank of the Brendon Hills. Besides Stogumber village itself, the parish includes the hamlets of Ashbeer, Capton, Escott, Higher Vexford, Kingswood, Lower Vellow, Lower Vexford, Preston, and Vellow. The village is on the route of the Samaritans Way South West.

History
The name comes from the Old English Stoke, meaning 'place' or 'dairy farm', with the addition in 1225 of the personal name Gunner.

The camp was nearly completely destroyed by quarrying and bulldozing.

The parish of Stogumber was part of the Williton and Freemanners Hundred.

The manor of Stogumber was held from 1286 by the Andleys family, and later by the Sydenhams (1396–1626) and Notleys (from 1896).

Five fulling mills were established in the village between the 13th and 18th century to support the clothmaking industry.

A 19th-century limekiln in Lower Vellow was originally attached to a quarry.

Governance
The parish council has responsibility for local issues, including setting an annual precept (local rate) to cover the council's operating costs and producing annual accounts for public scrutiny. The parish council evaluates local planning applications and works with the local police, district council officers, and neighbourhood watch groups on matters of crime, security, and traffic. The parish council's role also includes initiating projects for the maintenance and repair of parish facilities, as well as consulting with the district council on the maintenance, repair, and improvement of highways, drainage, footpaths, public transport, and street cleaning. Conservation matters (including trees and listed buildings) and environmental issues are also the responsibility of the council.

The village falls within the non-metropolitan district of Somerset West and Taunton, which was established on 1 April 2019. It was previously in the district of West Somerset, which was formed on 1 April 1974 under the Local Government Act 1972, and part of Williton Rural District before that. The district council is responsible for local planning and building control, local roads, council housing, environmental health, markets and fairs, refuse collection and recycling, cemeteries and crematoria, leisure services, parks, and tourism.

Somerset County Council is responsible for running other services such as education, social services, libraries, main roads, public transport, policing and fire services, trading standards, waste disposal and strategic planning.

It is also part of the Bridgwater and West Somerset county constituency represented in the House of Commons of the Parliament of the United Kingdom. It elects one Member of Parliament (MP) by the first past the post system of election.

Landmarks
Combe Sydenham is a Grade I listed 15th-century manor house.

Hartrow Manor was a late-16th-century manor house.

Transport
Stogumber railway station is an intermediate station on the West Somerset Railway, now a steam-operated heritage railway operating between Bishops Lydeard, near Taunton, and Minehead.

Religious sites
The parish Church of St Mary dates from the late 13th century. It has been designated as a Grade I listed building. It was founded as a Saxon minster with a chapelry at Bicknoller and other dues payable from property in Monksilver, Clatworthy and Elworthy. The Old Vicarage which is a now private dwelling, was built in the 15th century. The old brewhouse behind the vicarage is medieval in origin.

The Chantry chapel in Vellow was licensed as the Chapel of Our Lady Sweetwell in 1542.

The Baptist Church in Brook Street dates from the 19th century.

Notable residents
 George Fredrick Curtis (1906–2005), the founding dean of the University of British Columbia Faculty of Law was born in the village.
Zilpha Margetts nee Major was born on November 1, 1825 in Stogumber where her family worked in tailoring and shoe-making. C. 1854 she sailed for Salt Lake City where she married a fellow English expat Thomas Margetts. They decided to return to England but were caught in a skirmish on September 10, 1856 on the Oregon Trail near Fort Kearny in Nebraska. Thomas was killed and Zilpha was held captive by Cheyenne and never ransomed. 
 Elizabeth Sydenham of Combe Sydenham married Sir Francis Drake in the village in 1583.
 Richard Tucker Founder of (now) Portland, Maine, in 1633 was born in Stogumber in 1594.

In literature
John de Stogumber is the name of a chaplain in George Bernard Shaw's play Saint Joan. The name was selected after Shaw contacted the local rector to check that there was no-one living with the surname.

Gabriel Stogumber is the name of a Bow Street Runner investigating the robbery of a consignment of newly minted gold sovereigns in Georgette Heyer's novel The Toll-Gate.

References

External links

 The Somerset Urban Archaeological Survey: Stogumber, by Clare Gathercole
Stogumber village website
Stogumber Church website

Civil parishes in Somerset
Villages in West Somerset